Sing All Our Cares Away is a compilation album by Irish singer-songwriter Damien Dempsey. It was released in Germany on 5 May 2006 and brings together tracks from his Seize the Day and Shots albums.

Track listing

References

2006 albums
Damien Dempsey albums